The 2020–21 UEFA Women's Champions League qualifying rounds was played between 3 and 19 November 2020. A total of 40 teams competed in the qualifying rounds to decide ten of the 32 places in the knockout phase of the 2020–21 UEFA Women's Champions League.

Times are CET (UTC+1), as listed by UEFA (local times, if different, are in parentheses).

Teams
The qualifying rounds included 28 league champions from associations ranked 13 or lower, and two runners-up from associations ranked 11 and 12.

Below are the forty teams which participated in the qualifying round (with their 2020 UEFA women's club coefficients, which took into account their performance in European competitions since 2015–2016 season, plus 33% of their association coefficient from the same time span).

Format
In a change to the format as a result of the COVID-19 pandemic in Europe, the qualifying rounds were played as two playoff rounds, each consisting of single-legged matches hosted by one of the teams decided by draw. If scores were level at the end of normal time, extra time was played, followed by a penalty shoot-out if the scores remained tied.

Schedule
The schedule of the competition was as follows (all draws were held at the UEFA headquarters in Nyon, Switzerland). The tournament would have originally started in August 2020, but was initially delayed to October due to the COVID-19 pandemic in Europe. However, due to the continuing pandemic in Europe, UEFA announced a new format and schedule on 16 September 2020.

The qualifying round was originally scheduled to be played as mini-tournaments. The original match dates were 12, 15 and 18 August 2020, and were later postponed to 7, 10 and 13 October 2020.

First qualifying round

The draw for the first qualifying round was held on 22 October 2020, 12:00 CEST.

Seeding
The forty teams were seeded based on their UEFA women's club coefficients. Prior to the draw, they were divided into ten groups of four teams, each containing two seeded teams and two unseeded teams, based on political restrictions (teams from Russia/Kosovo, Serbia/Kosovo, Bosnia and Herzegovina/Kosovo could not be drawn against each other), COVID-19 travel restrictions and geographical approach. The teams in each group were assigned a number, with seeded teams randomly assigned either 1 or 2, and unseeded teams randomly assigned either 3 or 4. Four numbered balls were drawn, with the results applied to all Groups 1–10, such that a seeded team numbered 1 or 2 would play an unseeded team numbered 3 or 4 in each tie, with the first team drawn to be the home team.

Summary

The matches were played on 3 and 4 November 2020.

|}

Matches

Second qualifying round

The draw for the second qualifying round was held on 6 November 2020, 12:00 CET.

Seeding
The twenty winners of the first qualifying round were seeded based on their UEFA women's club coefficients. Prior to the draw, they were divided into five groups of four teams, each containing two seeded teams and two unseeded teams, based on COVID-19 travel restrictions and geographical approach. The teams in each group were assigned a number, with seeded teams randomly assigned either 1 or 2, and unseeded teams randomly assigned either 3 or 4. Four numbered balls were drawn, with the results applied to all Groups 1–5, such that a seeded team numbered 1 or 2 would play an unseeded team numbered 3 or 4 in each tie, with the first team drawn to be the home team.

Summary

The matches were played on 18 and 19 November 2020.

|}

Matches

References

External links

UEFA Women's Champions League Matches: 2020–21 Qualifying, UEFA.com

1
November 2020 sports events in Europe